Polyonychus is a genus of beetles in the family Buprestidae, the jewel beetles.

Species include:

 Polyonychus apicalis (Kerremans, 1912)
 Polyonychus dessumi (Descarpentries & Villiers, 1966)
 Polyonychus mucidus Chevrolat, 1838
 Polyonychus nigropictus (Gory & Laporte, 1839)
 Polyonychus proximus (Kerremans, 1890)
 Polyonychus tricolor (Saunders, 1866)

References

Buprestidae genera